Dariusz Romuzga (born 20 April 1971) is a Polish footballer (striker) playing currently for Kmita Zabierzów.

References

1971 births
Living people
Polish footballers
Wisła Płock players
Hutnik Nowa Huta players
Footballers from Kraków

Association football forwards